Cornwall Brothers' Store is a historic commercial building located at Alexandria Bay in Jefferson County, New York. It was built in 1866 and is a massive 2- to -story, three-by-seven-bay, structure built of coursed rubble stone. It was originally built as a store, but since the 1930s has been used for a variety of federal purposes, including the Alexandria Bay Post Office, the U.S. Customs and Immigration offices, and U.S. Coast Guard offices.

It was listed on the National Register of Historic Places in 1975.

Gallery

References

Commercial buildings on the National Register of Historic Places in New York (state)
Commercial buildings completed in 1866
Government buildings on the National Register of Historic Places in New York (state)
Buildings and structures in Jefferson County, New York
1866 establishments in New York (state)
National Register of Historic Places in Jefferson County, New York